The Walter B. Elliott Causeway is a causeway built in 1973 that connects South Twillingate Island with the rest of Newfoundland. It is part of Route 340 (Road to the Isles). Prior to the causeway, residents used a ferry service to travel between the Twillingate Islands and mainland Newfoundland.

References

Causeways in Canada